Lara Ivanuša (born 9 January 1997) is a Slovenian footballer who plays as an attacking midfielder or striker for Ferencvárosi TC and the Slovenia national team.

Club career
In 2017, Ivanuša joined Damallsvenskan club Kvarnsvedens IK. On 20 February 2018, she returned to ŽNK Olimpija Ljubljana, where she scored four goals in 8 league appearances and helped the club win its second consecutive Slovenian Women's League title.

On 18 July 2018, she joined Glasgow City.

International career
Ivanuša made her international debut in a Euro 2017 qualifier against Scotland in April 2016 in Paisley.

Honours

Club
ŽNK Olimpija Ljubljana
 Slovenian Women's League: 2016–17, 2017–18

References

External links 
 
 Lara Ivanuša at Prva liga Telekom Slovenije

1997 births
Living people
Slovenian women's footballers
Women's association football midfielders
Slovenia women's international footballers
Kvarnsvedens IK players
Damallsvenskan players
Glasgow City F.C. players
Expatriate women's footballers in Scotland
Expatriate women's footballers in Sweden
Expatriate women's footballers in Italy
U.P.C. Tavagnacco players
Serie A (women's football) players
Slovenian expatriate sportspeople in the United Kingdom
Slovenian expatriate sportspeople in Sweden
Slovenian expatriate sportspeople in Italy
Scottish Women's Premier League players
Ferencvárosi TC (women) footballers
ŽNK Olimpija Ljubljana players
ŽNK Radomlje players